Agha  may refer to:

 Agha (actor) (1914–1992), Indian film actor and producer
 Jalal Agha (1945–1995), son of the actor Agha, Indian actor and director in Bollywood films
 Agha (title), a civilian and military title in the Middle East
 Agha, Iran (disambiguation), places in Iran

See also
 Aga (disambiguation)
 Aga Khan (or Agha Khan), the Persian name used by the Imam of the Nizari Ismailis
 Agassi
 Aghasi (name)
 Aghasin (disambiguation)
Aghasura (a demon from Srimad Bhagavatham)
 Aqasi